Cacyreus dicksoni, the Dickson's geranium bronze, is a butterfly of the family Lycaenidae. It is found from South Africa, from the West Cape along the coast to the North Cape.

The wingspan is 16–24 mm for males and 19–25 mm for females. Adults are on wing from August to March.

The larvae feed on the buds, flowers and green seeds of Geranium and Pelargonium species. Young larva burrow into the side of the bud on which the egg was laid and feed on the forming petals. Later, they feed on the developing seeds as well.

References

Butterflies described in 1962
Cacyreus